Pablo Azar (born Pablo Azar  on July 27, 1982, in Mexico City, Mexico) is a Mexican actor.

Personal life 
Pablo Azar is an international actor and painter.

Pablo Azar was born in Mexico City and currently lives in the United States.

Charity work 
In 2013, Azar teamed up with and posed in an ad campaign for PETA, speaking out against animal cruelty in circuses and bullfights and asking fans to never attend either.

Filmography

Films

Television

References

External links
 
 

1982 births
Living people
Mexican male film actors
Mexican male telenovela actors
Mexican male television actors
People educated at Centro de Estudios y Formación Actoral
Male actors from Mexico City
21st-century Mexican male actors
Mexican people of Basque descent
Mexican people of Spanish descent
Mexican people of French descent